The Paper Brigade (also known as Gunther and the Paper Brigade) is a 1996 adventure/comedy film directed by Blair Treu. The film stars Kyle Howard and Robert Englund. The story follows a group of small-town paperboys who band together to prevent bullies from taking over their routes.

Plot
Gunther Wheeler has moved with his family from New York City to the small and quiet suburb of Pleasant Valley. Gunther shows distaste for his new surroundings, which he judges to be lame and uneventful compared to the city. Shortly after, he meets his nerdy next-door neighbor Charlie Parker and the local paperboys. Charlie suggests to Gunther that he take over the delivery route from paperboy Leonard, who will be gone for the summer, but an uninterested Gunther declines. At the town mall, Gunther meets Allison Robbins, a gorgeous waitress whom he instantly develops a crush on. Gunther runs into three local bullies, Chad, Luke, and Wylee, who are offering two concert tickets to see a famous band. Seeking a way to impress Allison, Gunther accepts their offer, but finds out the bullies demand $175 in cash only for the tickets.

In need of money, Gunther desperately calls Charlie about the paperboy job and swiftly accepts. Gunther assumes the job will be not a demanding one and carelessly tosses away a note Charlie gave him for helpful advice. On his first day on the route, Gunther runs into multiple unexpected nuisances, including pranks from bratty kids and an attack from a dog that jumps its fence. For his last delivery, Gunther decides to cut through the backyard side of a house, not realizing it is the home of Crazy Man Cooper, a former military serviceman who has a habit of attacking intruders. Cooper ambushes Gunther with a paintball gun and sics his flock of guard-geese on him. Gunther is about to quit when the recipient of his last paper delivery of the morning turns out to be Allison. Gunther delivers the paper to her personally, and reminded by his mission, tells Charlie and the others he’ll give the job another try.

The next day Gunther shows up at the mall with the two tickets on loan from Chad and asks Allison out to the concert, which she accepts. Later on his route, he sees one recipient's lawn is scattered with old paper deliveries. He goes up to the door to inform the recipient, and the owner, Ida Hansen, an elderly widow who loves baseball, kindly invites him in. Mrs. Hansen explains to Gunther that because of her old age and physical condition, it’s hard for her to check the lawn. Gunther ensures her that he’ll deliver her papers straight to her mail slot. Shortly after, Chad and his friends drive up beside Gunther while he’s on his bike, demanding payment for the tickets. They force Gunther off the road and he crash lands into a swimming pool.

Some time later, Gunther confronts Charlie and the others demanding to know why he hasn’t been paid yet. Charlie explains to Gunther that they make money off of recipients' tips, and that there have been several complaints from customers about Gunther’s performance. A fed up Gunther, determined to improve his service, wakes up early and devises a plan to counter the obstacles encountered along his route. He successfully tricks the unchained dog and outsmarts other rough customers, including a recipient who stiffs him on payment. He also faces off against old man Cooper and wins the battle, earning Cooper’s respect and gaining permission to pass through his yard. Gunther improves spectacularly in his job and attitude and gets tipped generously, earning more than enough money to pay off Chad for the tickets.

Seeing how much Gunther is earning, Chad becomes intrigued and decides to take over the paperboys' routes. Chad, Luke and Wylee descend upon the boys and demand the addresses and delivery routes. They corner Gunther into giving up the newspapers by threatening to beat him up, and Gunther relents despite the protests of Charlie. Chad punches Gunther regardless. Back in the garage, Charlie and the others are disappointed at Gunther for failing to stick up for his own friends.

Later at the mall, Allison gives Gunther the cold shoulder. Having heard about what transpired with Charlie and the paperboys, she blows him off because of his cowardice to stand up to Chad and his gang. Gunther visits with Mrs. Hansen, who says she misses him and asks why her papers haven’t been coming through the mail slot lately. Gunther regretfully tells her she has a new paperboy. Gunther learns the late Mr. Hansen was the co-founder of the local newspaper, and that every year on the couple’s anniversary, Mrs. Hansen goes to the stadium to watch a baseball game. However, she doesn’t know if she’ll be able to make the upcoming anniversary due to her condition.

The following day Gunther’s dad tells him how proud he is of his son for the progress and work ethic he’s demonstrated. Feeling remorse for his treatment of Charlie and the paperboys, Gunther gathers the group together and hatches a plan to sabotage Chad and his friends. Before the bullies can embark on their routes, the boys siphon gas from Chad’s car, forcing the bullies to deliver the papers on bike. They prank the bullies and lure them into Mr. Cooper’s yard, where they are ambushed by the boys and Cooper himself with paintballs. The bullies are driven off by Cooper's guard-geese and the paperboys claim victory at getting their routes back.

Later, a limousine arrives at Allison's house and she is presented with a rose, but to her surprise she is greeted by Gunther’s younger brother Andrew who explains to her that Gunther couldn’t make the concert because of something important that came up. Allison gets Andrew to tell him where Gunther is, and she arrives at a baseball stadium where Gunther has accompanied Mrs. Hansen to the game for her anniversary. Touched by Gunther’s maturity and selflessness, Allison gives Gunther a kiss.

Cast

Release 
The film was produced by the Utah-based company Leucadia Film Corporation and was released on video on February 5, 1997. It was frequently aired on HBO and the Disney Channel.

References

External links

 The Paper Brigade at IMDb
 The Paper Brigade  at AllMovie

1990s adventure films
1996 comedy-drama films
Films directed by Blair Treu
American comedy-drama films
1996 films
1990s English-language films
1996 directorial debut films
1990s American films